Edward Patrick Holcroft (born 23 June 1987) is an English film, television and stage actor. He is best known for his roles in the Kingsman film franchise and in the television series Wolf Hall (2015), London Spy (2015), and Alias Grace (2017).

Early life

Holcroft is the second of three sons born to Lt. Col. Patrick Holcroft, a soldier and Kathleen "Annie" Holcroft (née Roberts), a former publisher at Condé Nast. His elder brother, Oliver Holcroft, is a former soldier who served with the Grenadier Guards in Afghanistan. Edward was sent to boarding school at age 8, first attending prep school at Summer Fields School in Oxford and then to a Roman Catholic school,  Ampleforth College, in North Yorkshire. He initially wanted to become a professional drummer having attended music school, but switched to acting after appearing in a play at Oxford Brookes University. He then undertook post-graduate studies in acting at the Drama Centre London of Central Saint Martins, University of the Arts London, graduating in 2012.

Career

Holcroft is best known for his roles as Charlie Hesketh in the film Kingsman: The Secret Service and its sequel Kingsman: The Golden Circle, as George Boleyn in the British drama series Wolf Hall and as Alex Turner in the BBC drama series London Spy. In 2017, he appeared in the historical miniseries Gunpowder on the BBC and Alias Grace on Netflix and the CBC.

Holcroft acted with Dominic West and Janet McTeer in Les Liaisons Dangereuses at the Donmar Warehouse.

Films

TV series

Theatre

References

External links
 

People educated at Summer Fields School
English male film actors
English male stage actors
English male television actors
Male actors from London
Alumni of Oxford Brookes University
Alumni of the Drama Centre London
People educated at Ampleforth College
People from Westminster
1987 births
Living people